Higgins Point is a former mining camp in El Dorado County, California. It was located a half mile west of the center of Salmon Falls.  The place was named for the first person to open a store there, an Australian named Higgins. Rich diggings of gold were discovered by Mormons at Higgins Point in 1849.  Higgins Point was the first part of Salmon Falls to be laid out as a town, starting in 1853.

References 

Former settlements in El Dorado County, California
Former populated places in California
Populated places established in 1849
1849 establishments in California